Mr. Marcelo (born August 13, 1976) is an American rapper who was briefly signed to No Limit Records in 2000. Taking his name from New Orleans mobster, Carlos Marcello, Mr. Marcelo released his debut album, Brick Livin' through No Limit Records on July 25, 2000. Though it received good reviews, the album failed to make it very high on the charts, only making it to #172 on the Billboard 200 and #43 on the Top R&B/Hip-Hop Albums.

Early life
Mr. Marcelo was born and raised in the Magnolia Projects of New Orleans, Louisiana. He is the elder brother of rapper Currensy.

Music career
He achieved local success in 1992 with a song called "Hey P-Popper", which was a very popular dance at that time. In 2000 he was featured on the 504 Boyz single "Whodi", and released his first album, Brick Livin''', his only hit. In 2001 he released a second album, Streetz Got Luv 4 Me, which was not successful. He released a third album, Still Brick Livin' , in 2004 on his own label, Brick Livin Entertainment, and a fourth album, Son of Magnolia'', in 2006 on the Ball or Fall Records label. He has also released several mixtapes through Brick Livin Entertainment.

Discography

Studio albums

Mixtapes

Singles

As lead artist

As featured artist

See also
 No Limit Records
 Curren$y

References

African-American male rappers
Living people
No Limit Records artists
Rappers from New Orleans
Gangsta rappers
21st-century American rappers
1973 births
21st-century American male musicians
21st-century African-American musicians
20th-century African-American people